Medhane Alem Cathedral, whose name means "Saviour of the World", is an Ethiopian Orthodox Tewahedo cathedral in Bole Medhanealem, Addis Ababa, Ethiopia. It is the second largest cathedral in the whole of Africa and the largest in Ethiopia.

The church, along with Gennet Mariam, is decorated with external columns type of modern architecture of Ethiopia.

Gallery

References

Cathedrals in Addis Ababa
20th-century Oriental Orthodox church buildings
Ethiopian Orthodox Tewahedo cathedrals
20th-century churches in Ethiopia